Saurabh Chauhan is an Indian cricketer. He made his List A debut for Uttarakhand in the 2018–19 Vijay Hazare Trophy on 6 October 2018.

References

External links
 

Year of birth missing (living people)
Living people
Indian cricketers
Uttarakhand cricketers
Place of birth missing (living people)